The County of Normanby in Victoria, is one of the 37 counties of Victoria which are part of the cadastral divisions of Australia, used for land titles. The county is in the Western District of Victoria bounded by the Glenelg River in the west and the Eumeralla River in the east, by a line through Casterton and Hamilton in the north, and by Bass Strait (Portland Bay) to the south.  Larger towns include Hamilton, Portland and Heywood. The county was proclaimed in 1853, but it was known earlier since the 1849 proclamation of Follett County and Dundas County referred to its boundaries.

Parishes 
Parishes within the county:
Annya
Ardonachie
Audley
Balrook
Bessiebelle
Bolwarra 
Bramburra  
Branxholme 
Byaduk  
Byambynee 
Cobboboonee
Condah 
Croxton West 
Curracurt  
Dartmoor (part in the County of Follett) 
Digby 
Drik Drik  
Drumborg 
Dunmore 
Eumeralla
Glenaulin 
Glenelg (part in the County of Follett)  
Gorae 
Grassdale 
Greenhills 
Heywood  
Homerton  
Hotspur 
Kentbruck  
Killara 
Macarthur
Merino
Mocamboro
Monivae 
Mouzie     
Murndal 
Myamyn 
Myaring  
Napier 
Narrawong  
Portland
Sandford
South Hamilton
Tahara 
Tarragal
Trewalla
Tyrendarra
Warrabkook 
Warrain  
Wataepoolan 
Weecurra  
Weerangourt 
Winyayung
Yatchew West
Yulecart

See also 
 List of reduplicated Australian place names

References 

 Research aids, Victoria 1910
 Map of the counties of Follett, Dundas, Ripon, Normanby, Villiers, Hampden, Heytesbury / John Sands

External links 

Counties of Victoria (Australia)
Barwon South West (region)